African dance refers to the various dance styles of sub-Saharan Africa. These dances are closely connected with the traditional rhythms and music traditions of the region. Music and dancing is an integral part of many traditional African societies. Songs and dances facilitate teaching and promoting social values, celebrating special events and major life milestones, performing oral history and other recitations, and spiritual experiences. African dance utilizes the concepts of polyrhythm and total body articulation.  African dances are a collective activity performed in large groups, with significant interaction between dancers and onlookers in the majority of styles.

History

Characteristics

Traditional dance in Africa occurs collectively, expressing the values and desires of the community more than that of individuals or couples. Although dances may appear spontaneous, they are usually strictly choreographed. Improvisation is limited as it places the focus on the individual over the group. Early outsider commentaries noted the absence of the kind of close couple dancing popular in Europe and North America: such dancing was thought to be immoral or in poor taste in many traditional African societies. Among the Yoruba, to give a specific example, touching while dancing is rare except in special circumstances. The only African country whose traditional dances involve partners is Cameroon.

Dances are usually segregated by sex, where gender roles in children and other community structures such as kinship, age, and political status are often reinforced. Many dances are divided by gender, as a result of associations with gender-divided labor, as well as cultural beliefs about gender roles and gender expressions. Dances celebrate the passage from childhood to adulthood or spiritual worship. Among the Lunda people of Zambia, for example, young girls remain in seclusion for months to practice the dance for their coming of age ritual.

In traditional African societies, children begin to learn their traditional songs, rhythms, and dances from the moment of birth, starting with the lullabies sung by their mothers. While carried on their mother's backs during day-to-day work and social events, they are exposed to the music their mothers sing or listen to. Thomas Edward Bodwich, an early European observer, noted that "children will move their heads and limbs, while on their mother's backs, in exact unison with the tune which is playing." Many traditional African children's games, particularly in western and central Africa, include elements that promote the child's ability to understand rhythms. When children are old enough to attempt the dance moves, they imitate accomplished older dancers until they can replicate the dances precisely. They are only permitted to improvise when they have mastered the prescribed choreography.

Musical accompaniment for African dances is highly varied. Most dances make use of the human voice in the form of singing, shouting, recitations, grunts, whispering, and other vocalizations. Many groups use drums. In an African community, coming together in response to the beating of the drum is an opportunity to give one another a sense of belonging and of solidarity, a time to connect with each other and be part of a collective rhythm of the life in which young and old, rich and poor, men and women are all invited to contribute to the society. On the other hand, nomadic groups such as the Maasai do not traditionally use drums.

Many African dances are polyrhythmic, that is, they utilize two or more conflicting rhythms simultaneously. Dancers may synchronize the movements of different body parts to different rhythms, or alternate fluidly between rhythms. Dancers in Nigeria, for example, commonly combine at least two rhythms in their movement, or three if they are particularly talented. Any more than that is a rare feat. They may also add rhythmic components independent of those in the music. Very complex movements are possible even though the body does not move through space.

Dance historian Jacqui Malone describes how different groups use body parts in distinct ways: "The Anlo-Ewe and Lobi of Ghana emphasize the upper body, while the Kalabari of Nigeria give a subtle accent to the hips. The Akan of Ghana use the feet and hands in specific ways. Strong contraction-release movements of the pelvis and upper torso characterize both male and female dancing in Agbor."

Notable dances
Specific notable African dances, divided by region, include:

Eastern Africa 

Adumu: a Maasai jumping dance performed during the warriors' coming of age ceremony. A circle is formed by the warriors, and one or two at a time will enter the center to begin jumping. Members of the group may raise the pitch of their voices based on the height of the jump.

Southern Africa 

 Indlamu: a stamping line dance performed by young men which comes from the Nguni people of Southern Africa, with numerous variations depending on the tribe.
 Jerusarema: a dance of Zimbabwean origin, characterized by quick, powerful movements and lunges performed from a crouched position.
 Mohobelo: the "striding dance" of the Sotho of Southern Africa also features leaping, kicking, sliding, and sinuous movements close to the ground.
Mokhibo: the "shoulder dance" is also predominantly seen in the southern part of Africa, specifically in Lesotho. It is done by women. The dance comprises artistic and rhythmic movements of shoulders.
 Muchongoyo: a Zimbabwean dance performed by men, with participation from women in the form of singing and playing of instruments as well as dancing along on the sidelines. The women sometimes form a line and dance around the men. The Muchongoyo is a spiritual dance performed to celebrate important events and connect participants to the divine.
 Umteyo: a Xhosa dance performed by young men, in which the whole torso is undulated rapidly. The Xhensa dance is a similar form performed by older men, accompanied by clapping, singing, and roaring.
Ukusina: a Zulu women's dance performed in South Africa during Umemulo, the women's coming of age ceremony.

Western Africa 

 Agahu: a circle dance created prior to World War II by Egun speakers in Benin speaking people of Ketonu, possibly as a modification of a dance style called "gome".
 Agbekor: a warrior's dance that originated with the Fon and Ewe peoples of West Africa. This dance is performed with horsetails, and the movements mimic battlefield tactics such as stabbing with the end of the horsetail.
 Assiko: a partner dance which originated with the Bassa people of Cameroon.
Kpanlogo: a Ghanaian dance that originated with the Ga people around the 1940s, Kpanlogo is a free-flowing highlife dance form performed to conga-like drums.
Kakilambe: a West African ritual dance of uncertain geographical origin involving ropes and a central figure in a mask.
Moribayassa: a solo dance from the Malinke people of Guinea, performed by a woman to celebrate overcoming significant hardship. The dancer, wearing old clothing, dances around the village while singing, followed by musicians and other women. She concludes by changing into a new outfit and burying her old clothes in a special spot.
Agbadza: original rhythm and danse  of west Africa. Benin, Togo and Ghana use this music very well. 
Yankadi: originating with the Mandinka people of West Africa, this slow group dance is performed by men and women, and is usually followed by the faster Macru dance.

Dance in the African diaspora

See also
Ball culture
Rhythm and dance

References

Bibliography

Further reading 
Kubik, Gerhard, Zum Verstehen afrikanischer Musik, Aufsätze, Reihe: Ethnologie: Forschung und Wissenschaft, Bd. 7, 2., aktualisierte und ergänzte Auflage, 2004, 448 S., 
Online Reference on Agbekor and Kpanlogo
Online Reference on Agahu
Oyortey, Zagba (1993), "Still Dancing Downwards and Talking Back". In: Thomas H. (ed.). Dance, Gender and Culture, Palgrave Macmillan, London.

External links
African Dance – the cultural background
The Association of Dance of the African Diaspora 
CK Ladzekpo – African Music and Dance
Danceafreaka
Evolution Of Nigeria Dance Gala To Gbeku Dance
Katherine Dunham – She Lives
Savoy Style: African Influences on Swing Dance
The Umfundalai Tradition of African Dance and Philosophy